is a Japanese manga series written and illustrated by Sankaku Head. It was serialized in Shueisha's seinen manga magazine Weekly Young Jump from March 2013 to November 2017, with its chapters collected in twelve tankōbon volumes. An alternative version was serialized for two chapters in Shueisha's monthly magazine Miracle Jump in 2012. A sequel manga titled Himouto! Umaru-chan G ran from November 2017 to April 2018 and was collected in one volume. An anime television series adaptation aired in 2015. A second season titled Himouto! Umaru-chan R aired from October to December 2017.

Premise
Umaru Doma is a high school girl living with her older brother Taihei. At school, Umaru appears to be the ideal student with good looks, top grades and many talents. However, she transforms into a kid-sized layabout and spends time at home feeding her video game and food addiction, much to Taihei's dismay. Throughout the series, Umaru uses her alternative personality to make friends with others, while at home she throws tantrums about Taihei not buying her things.

Characters

 A high school girl with beautiful looks, top grades and excellence in everything. She reverts to a secret lifestyle at home, where she wears a hamster hoodie and is really a die-hard otaku. While indoors, she is drawn in a chibi manner, later calling herself Komaru (Umaru's sister) when Kirie catches her in the persona. She lives with her brother Taihei. She wears a cap while at the amusement arcade, where she is a well-known gamer who goes by the initials UMR. She wears a mask to hide her identity from Sylphynford.

Umaru's older brother working at the company. He lives in a 1DK apartment. The siblings move in a year before the series. He is described as having a kind and methodical personality. He reprimands Umaru for being lazy.

Umaru's buxom classmate living in the ground-floor apartment near the siblings. She is very shy, and is originally from Akita Prefecture, occasionally reverting to dialect when she is nervous. Because of her breasts, she has a lack of confidence as people look at her. The first person to look her in the eyes is Taihei, whom she later has a crush on and gets flustered whenever he gives her compliments. Nana's brother works at a restaurant in Tokyo. Taihei suspects he might have met him on his business trip. She appears in the spin-off manga , after having placed first in a Niconico Seiga poll among other characters.

One of Umaru's classmates. She is very openly competitive and considers Umaru a rival in academics and sports. She becomes friends with Umaru's persona with hopes of beating her at school, and later gets along with her friends. She is half-Japanese and German.

A classmate and a petite girl with frightening eyes to scare others. She is shy and has a great admiration for Umaru. She becomes friends with Komaru, thinking she is her sister. She is a servant calling her Master. She considers Ebina a rival for Umaru's affection. She is a member of the swim club, and is good at other sports like tennis. She aspires to be a picture book author.

 Kirie's brother with an afro. He likes to slack off at work. He and Taihei became friends since high school, but he was not as studious. He gets jealous when sees Taihei hanging out with the girls, but when he meets Komaru, he feels she is cute too. He tries to interact with Kirie, but she gets annoyed from him. Later when he meets Umaru in her outdoor persona and Ebina, he becomes very nervous and shy. He thinks Komaru and Umaru are two different people, and cannot recognize his sister during the trip.
 

 Sylphynford's brother. He works in Taihei's department. He is part German and has relatives from Europe. He enjoys playing video games. He knows of Umaru's dual personality. He later reveals that when he was in middle school, he was a shut-in. He later moved to Japan to work with Kanau.
  

  is the boss of Taihei, Bomber and Alex, described in Young Jump magazine as beautiful and excellent. She met Taihei and Bomber at high school ten years ago. She is very fond of Taihei, but gets annoyed by Bomber. Kanau is a single person and living on her own. Umaru becomes upset of her. Taihei reveals that she is the daughter of the president, a year younger than Taihei, and that they attended different schools. She has a younger sister Hikari. 
 

 A top student from the Gifted Youth Program with a hairpin and Kanau's sister. It is hinted that she interacted with Taihei, before knowing the set of constellations that he tried to show Umaru. She refers to Taihei as a big brother.
 
 Voiced by: Nobuhiko Okamoto|Bryson Baugus}}
Nana's older brother and restaurant chef. He left home when the latter was seven.

Media

Manga
The manga first appeared in Shueisha's monthly magazine Miracle Jump in 2012 for two chapters: first in the 10th issue on August 16 and again in the 11th issue on October 16. It was serialized in Weekly Young Jump from March 14, 2013. A total of twelve tankōbon volumes were published. A spin-off focused on Nana Ebina, titled  that is currently running on Niconico Seiga website and other platforms after ranked first on the website's popularity poll. Seven Seas Entertainment released the manga in English. The manga ended serialization on November 9, 2017. A sequel manga titled Himōto! Umaru-chan G began serialization on November 30, 2017 and ended on April 19, 2018.

Anime

An anime television series adaptation is produced by Doga Kobo. The series was directed by Masahiko Ohta and written by Takashi Aoshima, with character design by Aya Takano and sound direction by Yasunori Ebina. It was broadcast on the Asahi Broadcasting Corporation in Japan from July 9 to September 24, 2015, and was simulcast worldwide by Crunchyroll. The opening theme is  performed by Aimi Tanaka, while the ending theme is  performed by Tanaka, Akari Kageyama, Haruka Shiraishi and Yurina Furukawa. The series is licensed in North America by Sentai Filmworks. An original video animation was bundled with the manga's seventh volume on October 19, 2015, with another to be bundled with the tenth volume of the manga in Q2 2017. In the Weekly Young Jump magazine's 20th issue of 2017, a second season of the anime series titled Himouto! Umaru-chan R was announced for fall 2017 with the same cast. The opening theme is "Nimensei Ura Omote Life!" (にめんせい☆ウラオモテライフ！) performed by Tanaka. The ending theme is "Umarun Taisou" (うまるん体操) performed by Sisters (妹S), the voice actresses of the four main girls. The second season was simulcast on Anime Strike in the United States, on Hidive outside of the US, and on AnimeLab in Australia and New Zealand. Sentai Filmworks has announced on September 27, 2017 that they have licensed Himouto! Umaru-chan R. In the UK, MVM Films announced they had licensed Himouto! Umaru-chan R. In the Philippines, Umaru-chan was broadcast in Tagalog on the Hero and Yey! pay TV channels.

Video game
A PlayStation Vita sister-raising simulation game developed by FuRyu, titled , was released on December 3, 2015.

Reception
The manga had sold 2.2 million copies in November 2015. It had sold 2.7 million copies by March 2017.

The series ranked 16th in the first Next Manga Award in the print manga category.

Works cited
  "Ch." is shortened form for chapter and refers to a chapter number of the Himouto! Umaru-chan manga by Sankaku Head.
  "Ep." is shortened form for episode and refers to an episode number of the Himouto! Umaru-chan anime.

Notes

References

External links

  
  
 

2015 anime television series debuts
2017 anime television series debuts
2015 video games
Anime series based on manga
Anime Strike
Asahi Broadcasting Corporation original programming
Comedy anime and manga
Doga Kobo
PlayStation Vita games
PlayStation Vita-only games
Seinen manga
Sentai Filmworks
Seven Seas Entertainment titles
Shueisha franchises
Shueisha manga
Medialink
Toho Animation